Lalma may refer to:

 Lalma (Afghanistan), a village in Bamyan Province in central Afghanistan.

LALMA is also an acronym for:
 The La Asociacion Latino Musulmana de America, a Latino Muslim organization located in Los Angeles, California.